Freocrossotus maynei is a species of beetle in the family Cerambycidae. It was described by Lepesme and Breuning in 1956.

References

Crossotini
Beetles described in 1956